aha is an Indian subscription video on-demand and over-the-top streaming service  which offers Telugu and Tamil-language content. It is owned by Arha Media & Broadcasting Private Limited, a joint venture by Geetha Arts and My Home Group. 

The service was soft launched on 25 January 2020 and launched officially on 25 March 2020, coinciding with Telugu New Year (Ugadi).

History 
Allu Aravind revealed that he was enamoured with the digital environment and developed a habit of binge-watching. Soon he came up with the idea of starting a streaming platform for hosting solely Telugu content. He then discussed the idea with his family, who encouraged him and which led to talks with Rameswar Rao Jupally, who joined as a partner in the venture. Ajit Thakur heads the platform.

Market and expansion 
After opting for a soft launch on 8 February 2020 an event named aha Preview was conducted where all the film makers who worked on ''aha Originals'' attended and presented their work. In November 2020, aha announced actor Allu Arjun as its brand ambassador. The platform has acquired one million subscribers within a year of its launch, and by July 2021, it has over 1.5-million paid subscribers and 40-million-plus users, catering predominantly to the markets of Andhra Pradesh and Telangana states.

In August 2021, aha launched aha kids, a sub-brand focusing on children's programming. It is scheduled to launch on 10 September, coinciding with Vinayaka Chavithi. aha 2.0 was launched in November 2021 on a cloud-native platform from Firstlight Media.

The Tamil language version of Aha was launched in February 2022.

Original programming
The service began its operation by acquiring digital rights of films such as Arjun Suravaram, Kaithi (Telugu dubbed version) and Choosi Choodangaane.

Original shows and series 
The original scripted content which debuted on the service during the soft launch was Kotha Poradu, Shithappens  and Geetha Subhramanyam 2020.  Masti's created by Krish debuted on 8 February 2020. For the first year, the scripted original content included 25 original shows. Talk show Sam Jam with Samantha Akkineni as its host premiered on aha on 13 November 2020. Aha has planning to offer over 50 original shows for the year 2021. Aha Talk show Unstoppable With NBK with Nandamuri Balakrishna ranked 5th on IMDB among the top 10 reality shows.

Series list

Original films 

The following original films debuted on the service during the COVID-19 pandemic; most films which had scheduled theatrical releases have been shifted to online release. Aha have acquired many films to be presented as aha original films.

References

External links
 

Indian entertainment websites
Subscription video on demand services
Internet television streaming services
Self-censorship
Internet properties established in 2020